Santa Barbara Cottage Hospital is a community hospital in the city of Santa Barbara, California. It is owned and operated by the Cottage Health System.

Services
Santa Barbara Cottage Hospital is a full-service hospital, primarily serving the diverse population of Santa Barbara County. There are three other satellite hospitals within the Cottage Health system: Santa Ynez Cottage Hospital, Goleta Valley Cottage Hospital, and Cottage Rehabilitation Hospital.   The hospital has regular medical-surgical beds as well as a CCU and an ICU.

Several medical services are offered, including a neonatal intensive care unit and the hospital was recognized for its geriatric care.

Santa Barbara Cottage Hospital is a Level I Trauma Center (upgraded from Level II in 2017) and the largest between Los Angeles and San Francisco.

History 

The hospital opened on December 8, 1891 as a twenty-five bed hospital by Mary A. Ashley. The original building was designed by the prominent local architect Peter J. Barber.

On June 4 2021, Princess Lilibet of Sussex, daughter of Prince Harry, Duke of Sussex and Meghan, Duchess of Sussex, and granddaughter of King Charles III, was born at the hospital.

References

External links 
 Cottage Hospital 

Hospital buildings completed in 1888
Hospitals in Santa Barbara County, California
Hospitals established in 1888
Buildings and structures in Santa Barbara, California
Cottage hospitals
Trauma centers